Riley Chamberlin (November 7, 1854 – January 24, 1917) was an American silent film actor.

Born in Byron, Michigan, he was a graduate of Grand Rapids High School in Grand Rapids, Michigan. He attended Clinet College, Cornell University, and the Gardiner Academy of Music in Chicago.

In 1910, billed as Riley Chamberlain, he performed in Lulu's Husbands on Broadway.

In 1912, he began acting in films with the Thanhouser Company at the age of 57, and starred in over 100 films until his death five years later at the age of 62.

Selected filmography

References

External links

1854 births
1917 deaths
American male silent film actors
Male actors from Grand Rapids, Michigan
Male actors from New Rochelle, New York
20th-century American male actors